F110, F.110 or F-110 may refer to :
 F-110 Spectre, the original United States Air Force designation of the McDonnell Douglas F-4 Phantom II aircraft
 General Electric F110, a jet engine
 a model of truck in the Ford F-Series
 F110 class frigate, a class of frigates under development for the Spanish Navy